The Toledo News Bee is a defunct newspaper that served Toledo, Ohio, and much of northwestern Ohio in the early part of the 20th century. It was formed from the 1903 merger of The Toledo News and The Toledo Bee, and was published until August 2, 1938, when it was purchased by The Toledo Blade for USD787,000. It was published by the Scripps-McRae group, which became later known as Scripps-Howard, from 1903, when it purchased the News, the Bee and The Toledo Times, until its demise.

Hall of Fame baseball player Addie Joss served as its Sunday sports editor and as a columnist. He proved so popular with readers that the paper's sales increased dramatically and a special phone line was installed in his office to allow readers to contact him directly.

The Toledo Bee was owned and run by the Cochrane Brothers. Negley Cochrane , owner, hired his 5 younger Brothers; Witt, Tom, George, Robert and Philip (P.D.) The 5 younger brothers went on to creating the Witt Cochrane ad agency in Chicago and later created Independent Moving Pictures (IMP) the predecessor to Universal Pictures, and later Unuversal, alongside Carl Laemmle.

References

Defunct newspapers published in Ohio
Publications disestablished in 1938
Publications established in 1903